Rick Parker may refer to:
 Rick Parker (baseball)
 Rick Parker (artist)

See also
 Richard Parker (disambiguation)